Francis Lyons (born 1798) was an Irish Liberal politician.

Lyons was elected as one of the two Members of Parliament (MPs) for Cork City at a by-election in 1859—caused by the death of William Trant Fagan—and held the seat until 1865 when he resigned, due to bad health, by accepting the office of Steward of the Manor of Hempholme.

References

External links
 

Irish Liberal Party MPs
UK MPs 1859–1865
1798 births
Members of the Parliament of the United Kingdom for County Cork constituencies (1801–1922)
Year of death missing